Mark Hollmann is an American composer and lyricist.

Hollmann grew up in Fairview Heights, Illinois, where he graduated from Belleville Township High School East in 1981. He won a 2002 Tony Award and a 2001 Obie Award for his music and lyrics to Urinetown. He is a former ensemble member of the Cardiff-Giant Theatre Company in Chicago. He played trombone for the Chicago art rock band Maestro Subgum and the Whole, and piano for The Second City national touring company and Chicago City Limits, an improv company in New York City. He attended the musical theatre writing workshop Making Tuners at Theatre Building Chicago and the BMI Lehman Engel Musical Theater Workshop in New York. While at the Making Turners workshop he began a show with Chicago-based writer Jack Helbig that became "The Girl, the Grouch, and the Goat," which has had professional productions in Los Angeles and Chicago.

Hollmann is a member of the Dramatists Guild of America and ASCAP. He lives in Manhattan with his wife, Jillian, and their sons. He currently is working on a new musical with his theatrical partner Greg Kotis titled Yeast Nation.

References

External links
 

Living people
American musical theatre composers
American musical theatre lyricists
Broadway composers and lyricists
Tony Award winners
Obie Award recipients
People from Belleville, Illinois
Songwriters from Illinois
Year of birth missing (living people)